The Kirana Hills is a small and extensive rocky mountain range located in Rabwah and Sargodha, Pakistan. It is also a place of tourist attraction in Sargodha City.

Due to its rocky landscape and minerals, a volcanic and geophysical survey was conducted by the Geological Survey of Pakistan. Its environs are heavily infested with wild boars.

Nuclear weapons tests 

Kirana-I was the assigned codename of the 24 subcritical 'cold tests' conducted by Pakistan from 1983–90. The Pakistan Army Corps of Engineers led the civil engineering of  potential sites for the tests to be conducted. The Pakistan Atomic Energy Commission (PAEC) carried out several tests of  the feasibility of  weapon designs; all tests were subcritical (cold) tests and produced no energy blast yield.

Additional studies on the radiation effects of nuclear explosions was also carried out by PAEC. The Kahuta Research Laboratories (KRL) also conducted subcritical tests of its own weapon designs.

The weapon-testing program proved crucial for the success of Pakistan's clandestine atomic bomb program and was kept in extreme secrecy with few having knowledge of its existence. The tests were eventually made public in 2000 by the political newspaper, The Nation.

Test preparation

The Pakistan Army Corps of Engineers started extensive engineering of the potential test sites sometime in 1979–83. Several coordinated meetings between civilian Pakistan Atomic Energy Commission (PAEC) and military officials finalized the potential sites and construction started in 1979. Work completed in 1983 in Chagai and Kirana as the tunnels and testing labs were reported as having been bored, and as being similar in construction to Chagai.

The "Special Development Works"(SDW), a special-purpose engineering unit of Pakistan's military scientists and military engineers was commissioned by Brigadier Muhammad Sarfaraz in 1977. Responsibility of weapon-test sites and logistics were overseen by the SDW as part of their role in the atomic bomb program.

The Pakistani military engineered the weapon-test sites carefully and had long realized the United States's growing suspicion of  secret military nuclear programs. All work was completed at night before sunrise and the area cordoned off to tourists. This was done due to avoid American 'Vela' nuclear monitoring satellites detecting the tests, as well as avoiding the civilian population in the area. Engineering teams were sent to de-seal, open and clean, the tunnels to keep out wild boars that are found in abundance in the Sargodha region. After preparations were completed and the tunnels were cleared out, PAEC's Diagnostic Group arrived with laboratory leader Dr. Samar Mubarakmand who came with trailers fitted with supercomputers and diagnostic equipment installed in the vans. They were followed by the Wah Group Scientists under Dr. Zaman Shaikh and PAEC's Directorate of Technical Development (DTD) under Hafeez Qureshi, with the nuclear device in sub-assembly form. The device was placed in the weapon-testing labs and monitoring systems were set up with around 20 cables linking various parts of the device with oscillators in diagnostic vans parked near the Kirana Hills.

The device was tested using the push-button technique set in vintage style. The first test was to see whether the triggering mechanism created the necessary neutrons which would start a fission chain-reaction in the actual device. However, when the button was pushed, most of the wires connecting the device to the oscillators were severed due to errors committed in the preparation of the cables. At first, it was thought that the device had malfunctioned but closer scrutiny of two of the oscillators confirmed that the neutrons had indeed come out and a chain-reaction had taken place.

Test teams
A series of 24 different cold tests were conducted by the Pakistan Atomic Energy Commission. This secret weapon-testing operation was called Kirana-I by Dr. Ishfaq Ahmad, a nuclear physicist, who was the laboratories director and technical member at the PAEC. Other PAEC test development personnel and teams included Hafeez Qureshi— director of the Directorate of Technical Development; Dr. Zaman Sheikh, director of the Wah Group Scientists (WGS); Dr. Naeem Ahmad Khan— director of Radiation and Isotope Applications Division (RIAD); Dr. Riazuddin— director of Theoretical Physics Group (TPG); and Dr. Samar Mubarakmand, director of the Diagnostic Group (Diag Grp).

As a result, between 1983 and 1990, the PAEC's Wah Group and DTD conducted more than 24 cold tests of the nuclear device at Kirana Hills with the help of mobile diagnostic equipment. These tests were carried out in 24 tunnels measuring 100–150 feet in length which were bored inside the Kirana.

The explosive HMX was used to trigger the device that was tested by DTD led by Hafeez Qureshi, a mechanical engineer. The successful cold-fission test was supervised by Ishfaq Ahmad and witnessed by key high officials including PAEC chairman Munir Ahmad Khan; General Khalid Mahmud Arif, Chief of Army Staff; and Ghulam Ishaq Khan, then Chairman Senate.

Results and aftermath
The cold test of 1983 by PAEC was a major step in Pakistan's nuclear weapons program. However, it did not mean PAEC had produced Pakistan's nuclear bomb. As Houston Wood, Professor of Mechanical & Aerospace Engineering, University of Virginia, Charlottesville, USA, points out in his article on gas centrifuges, "The most difficult step in building a nuclear weapon is the production of fissile material", yet PAEC had not produced any fissile material by 1983. So, the most difficult step in building a nuclear weapon had yet to be taken by PAEC.

The need to improve and perfect the design of the first nuclear device  required constant testing. 24 different cold tests were conducted between 1983 and 1990 with the help of mobile diagnostic equipment.

The United States Vela satellites began monitoring the region, leading to the testing program being moved to Kala Chitta Range. The test sites were  abandoned and the Pakistani government opened the region for public tourism in 1990.It also has Radar Station for monitoring the airspace of Pakistan.

Development and the test teams

Pakistan Atomic Energy Commission
 Munir Ahmad Khan – Chairman, Pakistan Atomic Energy Commission (PAEC)
 Ishfaq Ahmad – Member (Technical) of PAEC.
 Samar Mubarakmand – Director-General of the Diagnostics Group of PAEC (DG)
 Hafeez Qureshi – Director-General of the Directorate of Technical Development (DTD)
 Zaman Sheikh -Directorate-General of the Wah Group of PAEC (WG).
 Naeem Ahmad Khan – Director-General of Radiation and Isotope Applications Division (RIAD).
 Hameed Ahmed Khan – Director-General of the Radiation Physics Division (RPD).
 Masud Ahmad – Director-General of Theoretical Physics Group (TPG).

Special Works Development
Major-General Michael John O'Brian, Pakistan Air Force — Director-General of the Special Works Development
Brigadier-General Muhammad Sarfaraz, Pakistan Army — Deputy Director of Special Works Development

Government observers
General Khalid Mahmud Arif, Pakistani Army — Vice Chief of Army Staff
Ghulam Ishaq Khan, (SP) – Chairman of the Senate of Pakistan
Vice-Admiral Iftikhar Ahmed Sirohey, Pakistan Navy — Directorate-General Naval Weapon Engineering Branch (WEB).

See also
 List of mountain ranges of Pakistan
 List of mountain ranges of the world
 List of mountains in Pakistan

Sources

References

Bibliography

Project-706
Pakistani nuclear test sites
Nuclear history of Pakistan
Nuclear test sites
Mountain ranges of Punjab (Pakistan)
Hills of Pakistan